The 1996–97 Maltese Premier League was the 17th season of the Maltese Premier League, and the 82nd season of top-tier football in Malta. It was contested by 10 teams, and Valletta F.C. won the championship.

League standings

Results

Matches 1–18

Matches 19–27

References
Malta - List of final tables (RSSSF)

Maltese Premier League seasons
Malta
1996–97 in Maltese football